Génesis Rodríguez Pérez (born July 29, 1987) is an American actress and model.  She began her career playing leading roles in the Telemundo telenovelas Prisionera (2004), Dame Chocolate (2007) and Doña Bárbara (2008–2009). She co-starred with Paul Walker in Hours. She also played Sarah on Entourage (2010–2011) and assistant museum curator/adventurer Jane Walker on Time After Time (2017), and has starred in the films Man on a Ledge (2012), Casa de Mi Padre (2012), What to Expect When You're Expecting (2012), The Last Stand (2013), Tusk (2014) and Run All Night (2015). She provided the voice for Honey Lemon in Big Hero 6 (2014), a role she reprises in the TV series (2017).

Early life
Rodriguez was born July 29, 1987, in Miami, Florida. Her mother, Luisa Carolina "Carol" Pérez Rodríguez, is a Cuban model. Her father, José Luis Rodríguez, is a Venezuelan actor and singer who is also known by the nickname "El Puma". Her parents married in 1996.

Career
Upon returning to Miami, she continued private instruction and obtained a recurring role on the NBC daytime soap opera Days of Our Lives from November 2005 to January 2006. She was also a returned special guest on the Bravo TV series Top Chef. In addition to American television, Rodriguez landed Spanish-language roles and played dual leads as Rosita Amado and Violeta Hurtado in the primetime series Dame Chocolate, which aired on Telemundo.

In 2012, Rodriguez had a substantial role as the love interest of Will Ferrell in the comedy film Casa de Mi Padre, a spoof in the style of the Mexican soap operas of the 1970s. She followed that role with an appearance in the action-thriller film The Last Stand in 2013, playing the villainous FBI Agent Ellen Richards, as well as appearing in the comedy Identity Thief as Marisol. In 2014, Rodriguez lent her voice to Honey Lemon in the Disney animated film Big Hero 6. In February 2017, she appeared as the main female role in the music video for Romeo Santos's song Héroe Favorito.

Filmography

Film

Television

Music videos

Video games

References

External links

 
 

1987 births
American entertainers of Cuban descent
American people of Venezuelan descent
American people of Canarian descent
American people of Spanish descent
American soap opera actresses
American telenovela actresses
Hispanic and Latino American actresses
Living people
Schools of the Sacred Heart alumni
Actresses from Miami
21st-century American actresses
American voice actresses
American film actresses